Battle rifles are full-powered rifles, full-length, fully automatic or semi-automatic rifles that have been adopted by a nation's military. The difference between a battle rifle and a designated marksman rifle is often only one of terminology with modifications to the trigger and accuracy enhancements; many of the weapons below are currently still in use, re-designated as DMRs.  For intermediate calibers firearms (e.g.: 7.62×39mm, 5.56×45mm) see List of assault rifles.

Below is the list of automatic rifles and battle rifles.

See also
 List of weapons
 List of firearms
 List of rifles
 List of machine guns
 List of submachine guns
 List of assault rifles
 List of bolt-action rifles
 List of straight-pull rifles
 List of pump-action rifles
 List of semi-automatic rifles
 List of carbines
 List of multiple-barrel firearms
 List of pistols
 List of revolvers
 List of semi-automatic pistols
 List of sniper rifles
 List of shotguns

References

battle rifle
 *